William H. Fauver Youth Correctional Facility (formerly known as Mountainview Youth Correctional Facility) is a New Jersey Department of Corrections state prison for young adult offenders ages 18-30, located in the Annandale section of Clinton Township in Hunterdon County, New Jersey, United States.  The present-day facility has a maximum capacity of 808 juvenile inmates.

The grounds encompass "747 acres of rolling hills", first used by the state in 1913 for a farm facility for the mentally ill.  It was redesignated as a corrections site for males between 16 and 26, "Annandale Farms", in 1929.  

From at least 2008, the prison has had a difficult history.  Two inmates have been murdered inside in recent years (Carl J. Epps, Jr. in August 2010, and Joshua Jones in August 2012), amid a long litany of assaults, drugs offenses, and inappropriate romantic relationships.

In February 2021 it was revealed that the prison would close in the coming year, as part of the state's $44.8 billion spending proposal.

References

External links 

 A set of vintage photographs

1929 establishments in New Jersey
Clinton Township, New Jersey
Prisons in New Jersey
Buildings and structures completed in 1929
Buildings and structures in Hunterdon County, New Jersey